The Diocese of Modon or Medone was a "Latin" (Roman Catholic) diocese located in the town of Modon in  Messenia in the Peloponnese region of Greece. It was established in place of the pre-existing Greek Orthodox see in the aftermath of the Fourth Crusade, with the creation of the Principality of Achaea and the establishment of Venetian rule over Modon in 1209.

Following its fall to the Ottoman Empire, in 1506 it was suppressed and became a titular see.

History
ca. 1205: Established as Diocese of Modone
1506: Suppressed as Titular Episcopal See of Modon
1925: Renamed as Titular Episcopal See of Methone

Ordinaries

Diocese of Modon
ca. 1205: Erected. Metropolitan: Old Patras

Leonardo Patrasso (1295 - 17 Jun 1297 Appointed, Bishop of Aversa)
Lodovico Morosini (1390 - 1407)
Antonio Correr, C.R.S.A. (24 Feb 1407 - 31 Mar 1407 Appointed, Bishop of Bologna)
...
Marino de' Bernardini, O.S.A. (23 Feb 1428 - 25 Sep 1430 Appointed, Archbishop of Corfù)
Gabriele Jacobi (15 Dec 1432 - 20 May 1448 Appointed, Bishop of Capodistria)
Angelo Fasolo (7 Nov 1459 - 16 Sep 1464 Appointed, Bishop of Feltre)
Johann Ostwein (12 Mar 1472 - 1491 Died)

1506: Suppressed

References

13th-century establishments in Europe
1500s disestablishments in Europe
1500s disestablishments in the Ottoman Empire
Modon
Medieval Messenia
Venetian period in the history of Greece
Modon
Modon
Catholic titular sees in Europe